Alec Douglas Bangham FRS (10 November 1921 Manchester – 9 March 2010 Great Shelford) was a British biophysicist who first studied blood clotting mechanisms but became well known for his research on liposomes and his invention of clinically useful artificial lung surfactants.

Life
Bangham was the son of Donald Bangham, and Edith Kerby. He studied at the Downs School, and then Bryanston School, and proceeded to earn an MB MS in medicine from University College London.

He was appointed to Addenbrooke's Hospital, where he served as a pathologist, in the Royal Army Medical Corps, becoming a captain in 1948.

Bangham worked at the Babraham Institute in Cambridge from 1952 to 1982.
He is best known for his research on liposomes.

Family
He was married to Rosalind; they had four children and eleven grandchildren.

His brother was Derek Bangham.

Awards
1965 doctorate of medicine from London University
1977 Fellow of the Royal Society
1981 Fellow of University College London
1997 distinguished fellow of the Royal College of Physicians

References

External links

1921 births
2010 deaths
British physiologists
Fellows of the Royal Society
Royal Army Medical Corps officers
British pathologists
Alumni of University College London
People educated at Bryanston School
Fellows of the Royal College of Physicians
Scientists from Manchester
People from Great Shelford